Mariam Alexander Baby is an Indian politician and member of the Communist Party of India (Marxist) from Kerala. He was elected to the Politburo of CPI(M) in the 20th Congress held at Kozhikode, Kerala, in 2012.

Personal life
M.A. Baby was born to P.M. Alexander and Lilly Alexander on April 5, 1954 at Prakkulam in Kollam district of Kerala. Baby did his schooling from Prakkulam Lower Primary School and Prakkulam NSS High School. It was during his high school days where he was first acquainted with politics. After completing basic schooling, Baby went to SN College, Kollam for higher studies. Later, Baby joined for BA in Political Science in SN College itself, but could not write the final year examination as he was incarcerated during the emergency period.

He is married to Betty Louis and has a son Ashok Betty Nelson.

Political life 
M.A. Baby joined Kerala Students Federation, the predecessor of Students Federation of India, while he was studying at NSS high school, Prakkulam. He has held many responsible positions in Students Federation of India, Democratic Youth Federation of India, Communist Party of India (Marxist). Currently he is a Politburo member of CPI(M).

He was the Minister of Education in Kerala during the period 2006-2011.

He unsuccessfully contested from Kollam against N. K. Premachandran of Revolutionary Socialist Party during 2014 Indian general elections.

References

External links

 Website

Communist Party of India (Marxist) politicians from Kerala
Malayali politicians
1954 births
Living people
Indian atheists
Sree Narayana College, Kollam alumni
Communist Party of India (Marxist) candidates in the 2014 Indian general election
Kerala MLAs 2006–2011
Kerala MLAs 2011–2016
Education Ministers of Kerala
Rajya Sabha members from Kerala
Students' Federation of India All India Presidents
DYFI All India Presidents